The Kickback is a 1922 American silent Western film directed by Val Paul and starring Harry Carey and Henry B. Walthall.

Plot
Aaron (Walthall) wishes to make Harry's land and girl his own. To do this, he sends Harry to Mexico with false papers for some horses. Harry gets arrested in Mexico, but soon escapes and returns home, where he is also arrested. Before he can be lynched, a Mexican girl brings the Texas Rangers to rescue him.

Cast
 Harry Carey as White Horse Harry
 Henry B. Walthall as Aaron Price
 Charles Le Moyne as Chaaalk Eye (credited as Charles J. Le Moyne)
 Vester Pegg as Ramon Pinellos
 Mignonne Golden as Conchita Pinellos
 Ethel Grey Terry as Nellie
 James O'Neill

See also
 Harry Carey filmography

References

External links

 
 

1922 films
American black-and-white films
1922 Western (genre) films
Films directed by Val Paul
Film Booking Offices of America films
Silent American Western (genre) films
1920s American films
1920s English-language films